Christine Ann Ferer is a New York City public servant, entrepreneur and philanthropist. She is the Founder and Chairman of Vidicom, one of the first branded content media companies with a well-known consumer brand, Citybuzz. She served Michael Bloomberg as his liaison to the families of 9/11. Christy is also a founding board member of the World Trade Center Performing Arts Center.

She is a recipient of the French Legion of Honor and the Matrix Award for Women in Communications.

Christy was formerly married to Neil David Levin, former executive director of the Port Authority of New York and New Jersey. He was killed during the September 11 attacks in New York.

Education
Ferer graduated from Ladue Horton Watkins High School in 1968.

 Premiere Degree de La Langue Francaise, University of Bordeaux
 BA (French) and BS (Journalism), University of Colorado
 MA Urban Affairs, Boston University 
 Grunsfeld Fellow, Massachusetts Institute of Technology

Vidicom
Ferer began her career as an Emmy Award-winning television correspondent and anchorperson beginning at KSDK St. Louis in 1974, and at WPIX New York 1976-1981.  She remained a contributor to morning news programs on ABC, NBC, and CBS for the next 25 years.

In 1981 Ferer founded two businesses. Vidicom became the first company to videotape fashion runway shows. The stylish content became a staple of news shows and lifestyle programs. The lifestyle video news release that Vidicom created 30 years ago morphed into a branded content, native advertising, and interactive game-changing platform, called InteracTV. The digital platform linked major brands with consumers directly through the brands' own digital outlets, hosting live interactive interviews.

Citybuzz became the first in-hotel TV network, which grew to include mobile Wi-fi screens in subways, taxis, in-flight and online and traditional broadcast radio and TV, as a home for branded content. When you see "The Best of NYC" on a taxi screen or on a hotel TV, you are seeing Citybuzz content.

In addition, the firm creates video marketing for clients including Disney, Johnson & Johnson, AARP, LVMH, Donna Karan, Nintendo and General Motors. Vidicom's website is a video marketplace for bloggers and journalists to download branded videos.

Public service

Port Authority of New York and New Jersey, Commissioner 2004-2008

Javits Convention Center Board – 1998 to Present

World Trade Center Memorial Foundation, Development Chair

Since 2006, Ferer has worked with companies including InBev Anheuser Busch, Total, LVMH and Disney for multimillion-dollar gifts to help raise funds upwards of $450 million.

Special Assistant – Liaison to the families of September 11, Office of the Mayor

Ferer represented the 3,000 9/11 families on all government issues including victims compensation negotiations, Ground Zero rebuilding, gift programs, and DNA and property identification processes.  Ferer drove the fundraising and creation of the Battery Park "Sphere" Memorial, as well as Memorial Park Chapel containing unidentified human remains, and the family rooms and platforms at Ground Zero. Ferer also drew on an extensive network of media contacts to shape the message the city and families wanted to convey on multiple public controversies.

Lower Manhattan Development Corporation, Advisory Council Board

Ferer was one of three family members affected by the events of 9/11 who created the mission and program requirements for a Ground Zero memorial. Since 2002, she has been on the Advisory Council Board, and has had responsibilities that included liaising with 9/11 families and shaping balanced media coverage through both New York newspaper op-ed pieces and multiple appearances on news broadcasts.

American Corporate Partners, Founding Advisory board member

Since 2009, Ferer has facilitated partnerships with companies like Bloomberg, Travelers, and AON.

Not for profit
 The 92nd Street Y	1988 – present
 Metropolitan Museum of Art Modern Circle
 Whitney Museum of American Art, Painting and Sculpture Committee 2010 – present
 Aspen Art Museum, National Council 2009 – present
 Association for a Better New York, Steering Committee	2002 – present
 Special Projects Committee, Memorial Sloan Kettering
 Global Green USA	1998 – present
 Museum of the City of New York 1996 – 2001
 New York Restoration Project, Secretary	 1997 – 2001

Publications 
 Newsweek: Back from Iraq and Prouder Than Ever
  New York Times op-ed: Unforgotten Soldiers
  New York Times op-ed: Lives Lost and the Renewal of Downtown

Books 
Breaking the Rules: Home Style for the Way We Live Today

Decorating on a Dime: Trade Secrets from a Style Maker -

References 

 

American philanthropists
American businesspeople
Living people
Ladue Horton Watkins High School alumni
Year of birth missing (living people)